Christopher Phillips (born 1959) is an American writer.

Christopher or Chris Phillips may also refer to:
 Chris Phillips (born 1978), Canadian hockey player
 Chris Phillips (chief executive) (1956–2007), chief executive of Scottish Widows
 Chris Phillips (hurdler) (born 1972), retired American athlete
 Chris Phillips (professor), British physicist
 Chris Phillips (voice actor) (born 1958), American voice actor, screenwriter and singer
 Christopher H. Phillips (1920–2008), American diplomat and politician
 Chris Philipps (born 1994), Luxembourgian international footballer 
 Chris Phillips (West Virginia politician) (born 1969), American politician from West Virginia

See also 
Chris Philp (born 1976), British politician